These are the results of the women's artistic team all-around competition, one of six events for female competitors of the artistic gymnastics discipline contested in the gymnastics at the 2004 Summer Olympics in Athens. The qualification and final rounds took place on August 15 and August 17 at the Olympic Indoor Hall.

The scoring for the team event had been changed again since the 2000 Summer Olympics in Sydney. The new format only 3 athletes from each national team competed on each piece of apparatus, and all scores counted towards the final combined total at the end.

The medals for the competition were presented by Carlos Arthur Nuzman, Brazil; IOC Members, and the medalists' bouquets were presented by Nicolae Vieru, Romania; FIG Vice-President.

Results

Qualification

Twelve national teams composed by six gymnasts competed in the team all-around event in the artistic gymnastics qualification round on August 15.
The eight highest scoring teams advanced to the final on August 17.

Final

References
Gymnastics Results.com
FIG - Fédération Internationale de Gymnastique

Women's artistic team all-around
2004
Olympics
2004 in women's gymnastics
Women's events at the 2004 Summer Olympics